Seda Yıldız (born December 7, 1998) is a Turkish female Paralympian goalball player. She is a member of the national team.

Sporting career
Yıldız competes for Kahramanmaraş Ertuğrul Gazi Disabled SK in Kahramanmaraş.

She enjoyed the champion title with the national team at the 2015 IBSA Goalball European Championships Division A in Kaunas, Lithuania, which was a qualifier competition for the 2016 Paralympics.

Yıldız was a member of the women's national goalball team at the 2016 Paralympics in Rio de Janeiro, Brazil. She won the gold medal with her teammates at the Paralympics.

Honours

International
  2013 IBSA Goalball European Championships in Konya, Turkey
  Malmö Lady- and Men InterVup 2014, Sweden.
  2014 IBSA Goalball World Championships in Espoo, Finland.
  2015 IBSA Goalball European Championships Div. A in Kaunas, Lithuania.
  2016 Summer Paralympics in Rio de Janeiro, Brazil.
  2019 IBSA Goalball European Champişonship in Rostock, Germany

References

Living people
1998 births
Turkish sportswomen
Turkish blind people
Female goalball players
Turkish goalball players
Goalball players at the 2016 Summer Paralympics
Paralympic gold medalists for Turkey
Medalists at the 2016 Summer Paralympics
Paralympic medalists in goalball
Paralympic goalball players of Turkey
21st-century Turkish women